Chatham High School is a rural secondary school (grades 9–12) in Chatham, Columbia County, New York.

CHS is the sole High School operated by the Chatham Central School District.

In 2006, CHS has 520 students in grades 9 to 12. In 2010 the enrollment was 451.

References

External links 
 Chatham High School
 publicschoolreview.com

Public high schools in New York (state)
Schools in Columbia County, New York